Racławice Śląskie, formerly named Racławice Niemieckie is a village located in the Opole Voivodeship (southern Poland), near the border with the Czech Republic. It belongs to the Prudnik County, in 2006 it was inhabited by 1600 people. Majority of inhabitants are descendants of Poles expelled after 1945 from the area of Berezhany Raion (see: Kresy), who replaced the expelled Germans (see: Expulsions of Germans after World War II). Until recently, Racławice was a rail junction, with trains leaving in three directions - towards Nysa, Kędzierzyn-Koźle and Głubczyce. Currently, the line Racławice-Głubczyce is closed.

References

External links
 Racławice Śląskie official website

Villages in Prudnik County